The elections to the City of Edinburgh Council were held on Thursday 4 May 2017, on the same day as the 31 other local authorities in Scotland. It was the third successive Local Council election to run under the single transferable vote (STV) electoral system.

The election saw the SNP become the largest party on the council for the first time, whilst the Conservative party overcame Labour to become the second largest party. Following the election Leith councillor Adam McVey took over control of the SNP group from Frank Ross. Conservative group leader Cameron Rose was similarly replaced by Iain Whyte. The Labour group elected Cammy Day as their leader.

The Labour-SNP administration formed in 2012 lost their majority however were able to continue in office in a minority administration, with Labour now being the junior partner to the SNP.

Boundary changes
Following the implementation of changes recommended by the Local Government Boundary Commission for Scotland the number of councillors to be elected was increased from 58 to 63. This was also the first election contested on new boundaries since the 2007 election. While the number of wards remained at 17, five wards:

elected four councillors instead of three.

The fourth placed and losing candidate in four wards was SNP and one ward a Lib Dem. In a re-run of the 2017 election the boundary changes would have likely lead to an increase of +4 SNP Councillors and +1 Liberal Democrat.

The Meadows/Morningside ward was also renamed as Morningside.

Election result

Ward summary

|- class="unsortable" align="centre"
!rowspan=2 align="left"|Ward
! % 
!Seats
! %
!Seats
! %
!Seats
! %
!Seats
! %
!Seats
! %
!Seats
!rowspan=2|Total
|- class="unsortable" align="center"
!colspan=2 | Labour
!colspan=2 | SNP
!colspan=2 | Conservative
!colspan=2 | Green
!colspan=2 | Lib Dem
!colspan=2 | Others
|-
|align="left"|Almond
|5.53
|0
|22.60
|1
|16.86
|1
|2.64
|0
|50.80
|2
|1.57
|0
|4
|-
|align="left"|Pentland Hills
|20.63
|1
|28.83
|1
|41.27
|2
|4.32
|0
|4.95
|0
|0.00
|0
|4
|-
|align="left"|Drum Brae/Gyle
|13.32
|0
|26.82
|1
|22.00
|1
|4.34
|0
|33.52
|1
|0.0
|0
|3
|-
|align="left"|Forth
|20.73
|1
|31.31
|2
|28.38
|1
|9.99
|0
|7.81
|0
|1.78
|0
|4
|-
|align="left"|Inverleith
|12.37
|0
|18.96
|1
|36.91
|2
|12.30
|0
|16.59
|1
|2.87
|0
|4
|-
|align="left"|Corstorphine/Murrayfield
|7.68
|0
|21.65
|1
|33.41
|1
|5.23
|0
|30.64
|1
|1.38
|0
|3
|-
|align="left"|Sighthill/Gorgie
|21.64
|1
|40.17
|2
|19.09
|1
|14.88
|0
|3.91
|0
|0.32
|0
|4
|-
|align="left"|Colinton/Fairmilehead
|20.59
|1
|20.73
|0
|49.76
|2
|4.28
|0
|4.64
|0
|0.00
|0
|3
|-
|align="left"| Fountainbridge/Craiglockhart
|13.84
|0
|21.04
|1
|31.80
|1
|27.61
|1
|5.04
|0
|0.68
|0
|3
|-
|align="left"|Morningside
|18.21
|1
|17.87
|0
|29.54
|1
|19.36
|1
|15.02
|1
|0.00
|0
|4
|-
|align="left"|City Centre
|13.25
|1
|25.07
|1
|32.68
|1
|20.52
|1
|8.00
|0
|0.48
|0
|4
|-
|align="left"|Leith Walk
|22.49
|1
|34.46
|2
|14.42
|0
|19.69
|1
|3.74
|0
|5.19
|0
|4
|-
|align="left"|Leith
|20.35
|1
|36.16
|1
|15.93
|0
|22.26
|1
|5.29
|0
|0.00
|0
|3
|-
|align="left"|Craigentinny/Duddingston
|23.25
|1
|37.11
|1
|23.72
|1
|11.70
|1
|4.21
|0
|0.00
|0
|4
|-
|align="left"|Southside/Newington
|20.12
|1
|20.54
|1
|26.93
|1
|20.35
|1
|12.05
|0
|0.00
|0
|4
|-
|align="left"|Liberton/Gilmerton
|32.27
|1
|33.80
|2
|23.24
|1
|5.17
|0
|5.52
|0
|0.00
|0
|4
|-
|align="left"|Portobello/Craigmillar
|30.39
|1
|32.56
|1
|19.48
|1
|15.10
|1
|2.47
|0
|0.00
|0
|4
|- class="unsortable" class="sortbottom"
!align="left"| Total
!18.37
!12
!27.08
!19
!27.74
!18
!12.41
!8
!13.62
!6
!0.89
!0
!63
|-
|}

Ward results

Almond
2012: 1xSNP; 1xCon; 1xLib Dem
2017: 2xLib Dem; 1xCon; 1xSNP
2012-2017 Change: One Lib Dem gain.

City Centre
2012: 1xCon; 1xSNP; 1xLab
2017: 1xCon; 1xGreen; 1xLab; 1xSNP
2012-2017 Change: One Green gain.

Colinton/Fairmilehead
2012: 2xCon; 1xSNP
2017: 2xCon; 1xLab
2012-2017 Change: One Labour gain from SNP

Corstorphine/Murrayfield
2012: 1xCon; 1xSNP; 1xLib Dem
2017: 1xCon; 1xSNP; 1xLib Dem
2012-2017 Change: No change.

Craigentinny/Duddingston
2012: 2xLab; 1xSNP
2017: 1xCon; 1xGreen; 1xLab; 1xSNP
2012-2017 Change: One Labour loss, one Conservative gain and one Green gain.

Drum Brae/Gyle
2012: 1xLab; 1xSNP; 1xLib Dem
2017: 1xCon; 1xSNP; 1xLib Dem
2012-2017 Change: One Conservative gain from Labour.

Forth
2012: 2xLab; 1xSNP; 1xCon
2017: 2xSNP; 1xCon; 1xLab
2012-2017 Change: One SNP gain from Labour.

Fountainbridge/Craiglockhart
2012: 1xGreen; 1xLab; 1xSNP
2017: 1xCon; 1xGreen; 1xSNP
2012-2017 Change: One Conservative gain from Labour.

Inverleith
2012: 1xSNP; 1xCon; 1xLab; 1xGreen
2017: 2xCon; 1xLib Dem; 1xSNP
2012-2017 Change: One Conservative & Liberal Democrat gain from Labour and Green.

Leith
2012: 1xLab; 1xGreen; 1xSNP
2017: 1xGreen; 1xLab; 1xSNP
2012-2017 Change: No change.

Leith Walk
2012: 2xLab; 1xSNP; 1xGreen
2017: 2xSNP; 1xGreen; 1xLab
2012-2017 Change: One SNP gain from Labour.

Liberton/Gilmerton
2012: 2xLab; 1xSNP; 1xCon
2017: 2xSNP; 1xCon; 1xLab
2012-2017 Change: One SNP gain from Labour.

Morningside
2012: 1xCon; 1xGreen; 1xLab; 1xSNP
2017: 1xCon; 1xGreen; 1xLib Dem; 1xLab
2012-2017 Change: One Liberal Democrat gain from SNP.

* = Outgoing Councillor from a different Ward.

Pentland Hills
2012: 1xSNP; 1xLab; 1xCon
2017: 2xCon; 1xLab; 1xSNP
2012-2017 Change: One Conservative gain.

Portobello/Craigmillar
2012: 2xLab; 1xSNP
2017: 1xCon; 1xGreen; 1xLab; 1xSNP
2012-2017 Change: One Labour loss, one Conservative gain and one Green gain.

Sighthill/Gorgie
2012: 2xLab; 2xSNP
2017: 2xSNP; 1xCon; 1xLab
2012-2017 Change: One Conservative gain from Labour.

Southside/Newington
2012: 1xGreen; 1xLab; 1xSNP; 1xCon
2017: 1xCon; 1xGreen; 1xLab 1xSNP
2012-2017 Change: No Change.

Changes since 2017
† On 20 February 2018, Leith Walk SNP councillor Lewis Ritchie resigned from the party and became an Independent, following complaints about his behaviour arising out of allegedly punching someone in a taxi.
†† On 23 April 2018, Inverleith SNP councillor Gavin Barrie resigned from the party and became an Independent, after losing his position in the ruling administration as Economy Convener, following a vote at the SNP group AGM.
††† On 4 July 2018, Sighthill/Gorgie Conservative councillor Ashley Graczyk resigned from the party and became an Independent, saying the UK government’s policies on disability issues and social justice are “incompatible with her beliefs and conscience”.
†††† On 17 July 2018, Drum Brae/Gyle SNP councillor Claire Bridgman resigned from the party for undisclosed reasons and became an Independent.
††††† On 28 January 2019, Leith Walk Labour councillor Marion Donaldson announced she was resigning from the Council citing reports of internal party tensions. A by-election was held on 11 April 2019 and was won by Robb Munn of the SNP.
†††††† On 21 February 2020, SNP Craigentinny/Duddingston councillor Ian Campbell stood down due to health reasons. A by-election was held on 12 November 2020 and was won by the SNP's Ethan Young.
††††††† On 30 July 2020, SNP Liberton/Gilmerton councillor Derek Howie resigned from the SNP Group to become an Independent.

By-elections since 2017

Retiring Councillors

† Originally elected as a Liberal Democrat candidate.
†† Originally elected as a Scottish National Party candidate.

References

External links

2017
2017 Scottish local elections
2010s in Edinburgh